Telmatherina prognatha is a species of fish in the subfamily Telmatherininae part of the family Melanotaeniidae, the rainbowfishes. It is endemic to Indonesia, where it occurs only in Lake Matano on the island of Sulawesi.

Sources

prognatha
Taxa named by Maurice Kottelat
Taxonomy articles created by Polbot
Fish described in 1991